is a passenger railway station located in Midori-ku, Chiba, Japan operated by the East Japan Railway Company (JR East).

Lines
Some Sotobō Line limited express Wakashio services from Tokyo to  stop at this station.

Station layout
Honda Station has a single side platform and a single island platform with an elevated station building built over the tracks and platforms. The station is staffed.

Platform

History
On 1 September 1907, the Bōsō Railway was nationalized and became part of the Japanese Government Railways, which was transformed into the Japan National Railways (JNR) after World War II. The station was renamed to its present name on 1 December 1914. Freight operations were discontinued on 1 October 1962. The station became part of the JR East network upon the privatization of the Japan National Railways (JNR) on 1 April 1987. A new station building was completed in March 2006.

Passenger statistics
In fiscal 2019, the station was used by an average of 7,034 passengers daily (boarding passengers only).

Surrounding area
 Honda Station Post Office
 Chiba City Honda Community Center
 Chiba City Honda Junior High School

References

External links

 JR East Station information 

Railway stations in Japan opened in 1896
Railway stations in Chiba Prefecture
Sotobō Line
Railway stations in Chiba (city)